Avenger is a 2006 American television thriller film directed by Robert Markowitz and written by Alan Sharp, based on the 2003 novel of the same name by Frederick Forsyth. The film stars Sam Elliott and Timothy Hutton. It aired on TNT on April 9, 2006.

Premise 
A CIA agent steps in to stop a former special forces operative on a for-hire mission that poses a global threat.

Cast
 Sam Elliott as Calvin Dexter
 Timothy Hutton as Frank McBride
 James Cromwell as Paul Devereaux
 Antonio Lyons as Washington Lee

Production
Filming took place in Cape Town, South Africa.

Release
The film was broadcast on TNT on April 9, 2006. It was released on DVD by Warner Home Video on October 3, 2006.

Reception  
David Cornelius of DVDTalk saying "Its plot is merely an afterthought, a thread on which we hang the coolness that is Sam Elliott".  Byron Lafayette in his column said "Avenger is a moody low stakes thriller that delivers action, and emotion and showcases the flaws of the "Greater good" system"

References

External links 
 
 

2006 films
2006 thriller films
2000s English-language films
2000s political thriller films
2000s vigilante films
American political thriller films
American thriller television films
American vigilante films
Films about the Central Intelligence Agency
Films based on works by Frederick Forsyth
Films directed by Robert Markowitz
Films based on British novels
Films based on thriller novels
Films shot in the Western Cape
Television films based on books
TNT Network original films
Yugoslav Wars films
2000s American films